Michael Enge Haukås (born 21 November 1986) is a retired Norwegian football player.

Club career 
He started his senior career in the Norwegian team Vard Haugesund in 2005, and in 2009 he played for Stavanger.

In 2010, he signed for Norwegian team Bodø/Glimt. He made his debut on 11 April 2010 against Mjøndalen.

After two good seasons with Bodø/Glimt he signed for Haugesund in 2012. He made his debut on 25 March 2012 against Vålerenga;and won the bronze medal with FK Haugesund in 2013.

After his contract with Haugesund ended in December 2015, he signed a two-year contract at Viking FK in 2016.

Haukås retired from professional football in 2017.

Career statistics

References 

1986 births
Living people
People from Haugesund
Norwegian footballers
SK Vard Haugesund players
FK Bodø/Glimt players
FK Haugesund players
Viking FK players
Eliteserien players
Norwegian First Division players
Association football midfielders
Sportspeople from Rogaland